Sex Lives of the Potato Men is a 2004 British sex comedy film, written and directed by Andy Humphries. The film is about the sexual antics of a group of potato delivery men in Birmingham and stars Johnny Vegas and Mackenzie Crook.

Sex Lives of the Potato Men has been called one of the worst films of all time.

Cast
Johnny Vegas as Dave 
Mackenzie Crook as Ferris
Mark Gatiss as Jeremy
Annette Bentley as Linda
Julia Davis as Shelley
Lucy Davis as Ruth
Evie Garratt as Joan's Mum
Robert Harrison as Kevin
Nick Holder as Gordon
Dominic Coleman as Tolly
Lee Tunbridge as blonde guy in group sex scene
Barry Aird as Gherkin Man
Joy Aldridge as Sauna Woman
Jeff Alexander as Bloke
Adrian Chiles as Towel man
Amerjit Deu as Doctor
Justin Edgar as Chip Shop Customer
Huss Garbiya as Beans
Carol Harvey as Chip Shop Girl
Alfie Hunter as Matthew
Laurence Inman as Bored Bloke
Jenny Jay as Coma Woman/Helen
Ceris Jones as Poppy's Brother
Helen Latham as Chip Shop Girl
Kay Purcell as Gloria
Nicola Reynolds as Poppy
Kate Robbins as Joan
Angela Simpson as Vicky
Nicholas Tennant as Phil
Betty Trew as Katie

Critical reception
Critics disliked the film intensely. The film has a 0% approval rating on Rotten Tomatoes based on 14 reviews, with an average rating of 2.1/10.

James Christopher of The Times called it "one of the two most nauseous films ever made". Writer Antonia Quirke, writing for the Evening Standard, called it "mirthless, worthless, toothless, useless". Kevin O'Sullivan in the Daily Mirror called it "one of the worst films ever made". Peter Bradshaw in The Guardian wrote, "it's a film which isn't in the slightest bit funny or sexy, and is deeply depressing. It also diminishes the reputation of many excellent TV comics, who are made to look tawdry and naff up there on the big screen in an echoing cinema".  Catherine Shoard, in a review of the film in The Sunday Telegraph, stated "It's hard to know what to say to this – it's like finding the right words at a nasty accident... Sex Lives of the Potato Men is probably the lewdest Brit-com since Confessions of a Window Cleaner, and certainly the worst". Shoard also described the film as "Less a film than an appetite suppressant". Ben Davis in the Morning Star later included Sex Lives of the Potato Men on his list of "some of the year's worst films".

One of the few positive reviews for Sex Lives of the Potato Men came from Mark Adams in the Sunday Mirror, who wrote that "Vegas and Crook are a sleazy dream-team and brilliantly cast as the soft-core spud men... After several pints and a curry it could be the lads' film of the year."

It was also controversial in that nearly £1 million of public money from the National Lottery via the UK Film Council was used to fund the project. Nigel Andrews in the Financial Times criticised the use of lottery funding for the film.

Years after the film was released, Sex Lives of the Potato Men was still being described by film critics as an unusually bad film. Hostile critics include Peter Bradshaw of The Guardian, and the BBC's Mark Kermode, who described the film as "absolutely, indescribably horrible, vulgar, stupid, tawdry, depressing, embarrassing, filthy, vile, stinky, repugnant, slimy, unclean, nasty, degenerative and mind-numbing". The Birmingham Post described it as "quite possibly the worst film ever made", while the Independent on Sunday stated that the film was "a strong contender for the title of worst film of all time". Donald Clarke of The Irish Times stated that "Sex Lives of the Potato Men attracted some of the worst reviews in living memory". The film magazine Empire placed it at no. 7 in its list of "The 50 Worst Movies Ever".

See also
List of films considered the worst

References

External links

 Sex Lives of the Potato Men at Rotten Tomatoes
If it's too smutty, you're too snooty article in The Guardian in which writer/director Andy Humphries answers the criticism of the film. Retrieved on 30-11-2006

2004 films
British comedy films
Films set in England
2004 comedy films
2004 directorial debut films
2000s English-language films
2000s British films